Retrieval could refer to:

Computer science
 RETRIEVE, Tymshare database that inspired dBASE and others
 Data retrieval
 Document retrieval
 Image retrieval
 Information retrieval
 Knowledge retrieval
 Medical retrieval
 Music information retrieval
 Text retrieval

Psychology
The process of recalling information that is stored in memory ("memory retrieval")

Film
 Retrieval (film), a 2006 Polish film
 The Retrieval, a 2013 American drama film by Chris Eska

ja:検索